The Opening Ceremony of the 2015 European Games was the official opening ceremony held in the afternoon at 9:00PM Azerbaijan Time (GMT+4) on June 12, 2015 in the Baku Olympic Stadium in Baku, Azerbaijan. It was attended by the President of Azerbaijan Ilham Aliyev, the President of the International Olympic Committee, Thomas Bach, the Vice President of Azerbaijan, Mehriban Aliyeva, and the President of the European Olympic Committee Patrick Hickey.The ceremony was attended by 68,000 spectators gathered at the Olympic Stadium, as well as hundreds of millions of online viewers. More than 300 creative teams from 28 countries were involved in organizing the ceremony. The cost of organizing of the ceremony was about 100 million U.S. dollars. The opening ceremony was directed by artistic choreographer Dimitris Papaioannou who was praised for his work during 2004 Summer Olympics.

Ceremony

A fanfare drew attention to the Presidential Box and welcomed President of Azerbaijan Ilham Aliyev, First Lady, Chair of Baku 2015 European Games Organizing Committee Mehriban Aliyeva and President of the European Olympic Committees Patrick Hickey. The flag of Azerbaijan was carried by eight and raised by three servicemen of the National Guard of the Special State Protection Service of Azerbaijan.

The torchbearer, Ilham Zakiyev, who is an Azerbaijani blind judoka, entered the stadium and was accompanied by Said Guliyev. Zakiyev and Guliyev made their way to the center of the stadium to light the Olympic cauldron. A traditional parade of nations was then held, which was opened by Greece, and ended with the representatives of the host team, Azerbaijan. After this, the First Lady Mehriban Aliyeva delivered a speech, followed by a speech by the President of the European Olympic Committees Patrick Hickey. After Hickey's remarks, the President of Azerbaijan Ilham Aliyev declared the European Games open.

American Singer Lady Gaga performed "Imagine", a cover from John Lennon at the event. The shapeshifting scene featured the representations of Yanar Dag and the Gobustan rock carvings, in particular. The woman on the stage (Nargiz Nasirzade) and the man (Aydemir Aydemirov) embodied the arrival of spring. Two thousand artists gathered at the scene to perform the yalli dance at the end. The opening ceremony was broadcast live on the official YouTube channel of the Games.

Attending dignitaries 

 President of Turkey Recep Tayyip Erdogan
 President of Russia Vladimir Putin
 President of Serbia Tomislav Nikolic
 President of Montenegro Filip Vujanovic
 Chairman of the Presidency of Bosnia and Herzegovina Mladen Ivanic 
 President of Belarus Alexander Lukashenko
 President of Turkmenistan Gurbanguly Berdimuhamedov
 President of Tajikistan Emomali Rahmon 
 Henri, Grand Duke of Luxembourg
 Albert II of Monaco 
 Bulgarian Prime Minister Boyko Borisov
 Prime Minister of Georgia Irakli Garibashvili
 Prime Minister of Romania Victor Ponta
 First Deputy Prime Minister of Kyrgyzstan Tayirbek Sarpashev
 Vice Speaker of the Latvian Saeima Andrey Klementyev
 President of Qatari Olympic Committee Sheikh Joaan bin Hamad bin Khalifa Al Thani
 Crown Prince of Saudi Arabia Abdullah bin Mosaad
 Former Latvian President Valdis Zatlers

Gallery

References

External links

 FULL REPLAY of the Opening Ceremony | Baku 2015 European Games

2015 European Games